The Colgate Raiders are the athletic teams that represent Colgate University. The teams include men and women's basketball, cross country, ice hockey, lacrosse, rowing, soccer, swimming & diving, track and field and tennis. Men's sports include golf and football. Women's sports include field hockey, softball, and volleyball.

The Raiders are members of the Patriot League for most sports, except for the men's and women's ice hockey teams, which compete in ECAC Hockey. Colgate is part of NCAA Division I for all varsity sports.

Approximately 25% of students are involved in a varsity sport, and 80% of students are involved in some form of varsity, club, or intramural athletics. There are 25 varsity teams, over 30 club sports teams, and 18 different intramural sports.

Starting in 1932, Colgate athletics teams were called the "Red Raiders" in reference to the new maroon uniforms of that season's "undefeated, untied, unscored upon, and uninvited" football team, which was the first to use the moniker. Apocryphal explanations for the name include the team's ability to defeat its much larger rival, the Cornell University Big Red, or that a rainstorm caused one Colgate football team's maroon jerseys to blend into a reddish color. Regardless, after the adoption of a Native American mascot, the school debated changing the name and mascot in the 1970s out of sensitivity to Native Americans. At that time the nickname was retained, but the mascot was changed to a hand holding a torch. In 2001, the administration acknowledged concerns that the adjective "Red" still had a Native American implication, and the school shortened the nickname to the "Raiders" starting in the 2001–02 school year. A new mascot was introduced in 2006.

Teams

Former sports
Baseball (1886–1996)
Wrestling (1930s–1982)

References

External links
 

 
Colgate Raiders softball